Norayr Musheghian (2 November 1935 – 23 December 2011) was an Armenian wrestler, coach and public activist.

Biography
Norayr Musheghian was born on 2 November 1935 in Yerevan to Armenian parents, survivors of Armenian genocide from Mush and Sebastia who arrived in Yerevan as orphan children. The first sport Musheghian took up was gymnastics, but due to injury he was forced to abandon it. He began wrestling in 1952 under the coaching of Artashes Nazaryan. Initially, he could not choose between freestyle and Greco-Roman wrestling, but ultimately chose to specialize in freestyle wrestling. He graduated from the Armenian State Institute of Physical Culture in 1957.

By the end of the 1950s, Musheghian was one of the top featherweight wrestlers not only in the Soviet Union, but also in the world. In 1958 and 1959 he won the USSR Championships, became a bronze medalist at the 1957 World Wrestling Championships, and won the gold medal at the 1958 Wrestling World Cup. Musheghian was the first Armenian freestyle wrestler to win a World Championship medal and win the World Cup. At the USSR Second Spartakiad in 1959, he came in first place. However, in spite of these successes the USSR national team coaching staff did not select him to partake at the 1960 Summer Olympics in Rome, after which Musheghian retired from wrestling. He received the Deserved master of sports of the USSR title in 1966.

He was the founder of the Freestyle wrestling school of Yerevan in 1966. From 1971 to 1977 he worked in Afghanistan and Madagascar, after which he returned to coaching in Yerevan and participated in the organization of several tournaments in wrestling. Musheghian was also known in Armenia as an active public figure and founder of the "Zoravar Andranik" All-Armenian Union in 1986.

He died on 23 December 2011, aged 76, in his home city of Yerevan.

References

External links
 InMemoriam.com - Norayr Musheghian

1935 births
2011 deaths
Sportspeople from Yerevan
Armenian State Institute of Physical Culture and Sport alumni
Armenian activists
Armenian wrestlers
Armenian male sport wrestlers
World Wrestling Championships medalists